Charles Malcolm Moss (April 18, 1905 – February 6, 1983) was an American professional athlete and attorney. He attended Vanderbilt University, graduating in 1927, and earned a Juris Doctor degree from the University of Chicago in 1930.

Moss' professional baseball career lasted for six seasons, 1927 through 1932. In his lone MLB stint, he posted no decisions with one save and two games finished.  In one starting pitcher assignment, on July 5, 1930 at Forbes Field against the Pittsburgh Pirates, he worked 4 innings and allowed six hits, three earned runs and three bases on balls, with three strikeouts. He departed the game with a 10–3 lead—having helped his own cause by going two for three at the plate with two runs batted in. But because he failed to complete five full innings as the starter, he was not eligible for the victory; the official scorer awarded the win to reliever Bob Osborn, who shut out the Bucs the rest of the way.

In his 12 MLB games, Moss allowed 18 hits, 14 bases on balls, and 13 earned runs in 18 innings pitched, notching four strikeouts and posting a 6.27 career earned run average. He batted .273 in 11 at bats, with three singles and two career RBI.

Moss maintained a Chicago law practice after his baseball career; he died at age 77 in Savannah, Georgia, on February 6, 1983.

References

External links

1905 births
1983 deaths
Baseball players from Indiana
Chicago Cubs players
Lawyers from Chicago
Los Angeles Angels (minor league) players
Louisville Colonels (minor league) players
Major League Baseball pitchers
Minneapolis Millers (baseball) players
People from Sullivan, Indiana
University of Chicago Law School alumni
Vanderbilt University alumni